Pfund is German for "pound weight" and is also a surname. Notable people with the surname include:

August Herman Pfund (1879–1949), American physicist and spectroscopist
Guillermo Pfund (born 1989), Argentine footballer
Jessica Pfund (born 1998), American skater
Lee Pfund (born 1919), Major League Baseball pitcher
Nicola Pfund (born 1960), Swiss-Italian writer
Randy Pfund, NBA head coach & executive
Roger Pfund (born 1943), Swiss graphic artist